This article details the fixtures and results of the Indonesia national football team in 2007.

Notes
  Indonesia was scheduled to play Guam in the first stage of World Cup qualifying but Guam withdrew. Indonesia advanced to the second stage.

2007
2006–07 in Indonesian football
2007–08 in Indonesian football
Indonesia